Chernomorets is a town on the Black Sea coast of southeastern Bulgaria. Administratively part of Sozopol Municipality, Burgas Province, Chernomorets is a popular seaside resort.

Until 1951, it was known as Sveti Nikola (Свети Никола, "Saint Nicholas"). Chernomorets means "Black Sea man".

Previously a village, it received town privileges on 2 December 2009 on the grounds that it met the demographic and infrastructure requirements due to its resort status. The town has a primary school, a kindergarten and a cultural centre (chitalishte).

Chernomorets lies at the low northern slopes of the Strandzha mountain, between Cape Emine to the north and the Arkutino marshland to the south. To the east is St. Ivan Island, with Sozopol to the southeast of the town along the seaside road.

Chernomorets has an Eastern Orthodox church dedicated to the town patron Saint Nicholas. A landscaped garden called the "Garden of Eden" lies just in front of it.

Gallery

References

 

Towns in Bulgaria
Populated places in Burgas Province
Seaside resorts in Bulgaria
Populated coastal places in Bulgaria